The 2012 Whites Drug Store Classic was held from November 9 to 12 at the Swan River Curling Club in Swan River, Manitoba as part of the 2012–13 World Curling Tour. The event was held in a triple-knockout format, and the purse for the event was CAD$50,000, of which the winner, Mike McEwen, received CAD$12,000. McEwen defeated Randy Bryden of Saskatchewan in the final with a score of 4–2.

Teams
The teams are listed as follows:

Knockout results
The draw is listed as follows:

A event

B event

C event

Playoffs
The playoffs draw is listed as follows:

References

External links

2012 in curling